Mannosylfructose-phosphate phosphatase (EC 3.1.3.79, mannosylfructose-6-phosphate phosphatase, MFPP) is an enzyme with systematic name β-D-ructofuranosyl-α-D-mannopyranoside-6F-phosphate phosphohydrolase. This enzyme catalyses the following chemical reaction

 β-D-fructofuranosyl-α-D-mannopyranoside 6F-phosphate + H2O    β-D-fructofuranosyl-α-D-mannopyranoside + phosphate

This enzyme, from the soil proteobacterium and plant pathogen Agrobacterium tumefaciens strain C58, requires Mg2+ for activity.

References

External links 
 

EC 3.1.3